is a railway station on the Sasshō Line in Kita-ku, Sapporo, Hokkaido, Japan, operated by the Hokkaido Railway Company (JR Hokkaido). The station is numbered G06.

Lines

Station layout
The station has two side platforms serving two tracks, connected by a passenger footbridge. The station has automated ticket machines and Kitaca card readers. The station is unattended.

History

References

External links

Railway stations in Sapporo
Stations of Hokkaido Railway Company
Kita-ku, Sapporo
Railway stations in Japan opened in 1986